Steinmetz Opel-Tuning is an automobile tuning company specialising in Opel cars, based in Aachen, Germany. They develop higher performance engines, sports suspension, special exhausts and complete aerodynamic bodystyling kits. Their engineers believe that the proving ground for all products is still in motorsport.

See also

Irmscher
OPC

Bibliography 
 Klaus Steinmetz - Ein Leben für den Motorsport, Klaus Steinmetz, Oliver Steinmetz, Heel Verlag (2007),  (German)
 Opel GT Motorsport 1968-1975, Stefan Müller, Detlef Kurzrock, Maurice Van Sevecotte, Petrolpics Verlag (2008),  (German)

References

External links
 Steinmetz German website
 Steinmetz English website

Video clips

Opel
Auto parts suppliers of Germany
Vehicle manufacturing companies established in 1993
Automotive motorsports and performance companies
Auto tuning companies
Companies based in Aachen